The 2019 City of Playford Tennis International was a professional tennis tournament played on hard courts. It was the second edition of the tournament which was part of the 2019 ATP Challenger Tour and the 2019 ITF Women's World Tennis Tour. It took place in Playford, Australia between 31 December 2018 and 6 January 2019.

Men's singles main-draw entrants

Seeds

Other entrants
The following players received wildcards into the singles main draw:
  Rinky Hijikata
  Max Purcell
  Akira Santillan
  Luke Saville
  Aleksandar Vukic

The following players received entry into the singles main draw using their ITF World Tennis Ranking:
  Sadio Doumbia
  Li Zhe
  Enrique López Pérez
  Alexander Zhurbin

The following players received entry from the qualifying draw:
  Andrew Harris
  Tseng Chun-hsin

Women's singles main-draw entrants

Seeds

 1 Rankings are as of 24 December 2018.

Other entrants
The following players received wildcards into the singles main draw:
  Alexandra Bozovic
  Gabriella Da Silva-Fick
  Kaylah McPhee
  Isabelle Wallace

The following players received entry into the singles main draw using their ITF World Tennis Rankings:
  Haruna Arakawa
  Miriam Kolodziejová
  Seone Mendez
  Greet Minnen
  Irina Ramialison

The following players received entry from the qualifying draw:
  Hiromi Abe
  Jennifer Elie
  Nadia Podoroska
  Ivana Popovic
  Lulu Sun
  Belinda Woolcock

Champions

Men's singles

 Rogério Dutra Silva def.  Mats Moraing 6–3, 6–2.

Women's singles
 Anna Kalinskaya def.  Elena Rybakina, 6–4, 6–4

Men's doubles

 Max Purcell /  Luke Saville def.  Ariel Behar /  Enrique López Pérez 6–4, 7–5.

Women's doubles
 Giulia Gatto-Monticone /  Anastasia Grymalska def.  Amber Marshall /  Lulu Sun, 6–2, 6–3

References

External links
 2019 City of Playford Tennis International at ITFtennis.com
 Official website

2019 ATP Challenger Tour
2019 ITF Women's World Tennis Tour
2019 in Australian tennis
January 2019 sports events in Australia